New Hampshire State Prison for Women is the only women's prison in the U.S. state of New Hampshire.   The New Hampshire Department of Corrections facility is located in Concord.

The new prison opened in 2018 after decades of legal battles concerning the services offered at the old Goffstown facility. It houses maximum, medium, and minimum security prisoners and overflow prisoners from the county prisons, which often lack appropriate facilities for women.

Since 2008, the Saint Anselm College Knights of Columbus and a group of women from the prison have started a recycling program within the prison. In 2009, Saint Anselm's Knights of Columbus Council #4875 won the National Community Activity Award from the Supreme Council in Connecticut. To date, the Knights and the women have recycled over 2,000 pounds of recyclable material.

Former inmates

Pamela Smart - Transferred to Bedford Hills Correctional Facility for Women in 1993.

Current inmates
Nicole Kasinskas - Convicted and sentenced to 40 years for the plot to murder her mother, Dominico. Her story was profiled on Investigation Discovery's show, Deadly Women.

See also
 New Hampshire State Prison for Men

References

External links
 New Hampshire State Prison for Women

Women's prisons in the United States
Goffstown, New Hampshire
Prisons in New Hampshire
Buildings and structures in Hillsborough County, New Hampshire
Women in New Hampshire
1989 establishments in New Hampshire